Experimental data in science and engineering is data produced by a measurement, test method, experimental design or quasi-experimental design. In clinical research any data produced are the result of a clinical trial. Experimental data may be qualitative or quantitative, each being appropriate for different investigations.

Generally speaking, qualitative data are considered more descriptive and can be subjective in comparison to having a continuous measurement scale that produces numbers.  Whereas quantitative data are gathered in a manner that is normally experimentally repeatable, qualitative information is usually more closely related to phenomenal meaning and is, therefore, subject to interpretation by individual observers.

Experimental data can be reproduced by a variety of different investigators and mathematical analysis may be performed on these data.

See also 

 Accuracy and precision
 Computer science
 Data analysis
 Empiricism
 Epistemology
 Informatics (academic field)
 Knowledge
 Philosophy of information
 Philosophy of science
 Qualitative research
 Quantitative research
 Scientific method
 Statistics

References
 NIST/SEMATEK (2008) Handbook of Statistical Methods

Data